Dominikanerkirche may refer to:

Dominican Church, Vienna
Chiesa dei Domenicani, the Dominican Church, Bolzano, Italy